The men's triple jump event  at the 1994 European Athletics Indoor Championships was held in Palais Omnisports de Paris-Bercy on 12 March.

Results

References

Final results

Triple jump at the European Athletics Indoor Championships
Triple